Helen Paradeiser is a former Australian female professional squash player. Her sister Sonia Paradeiser was also a squash player who played in domestic level matches.

Career 
She emerged as runner-up in the women's individual event at the 1983 World Junior Squash Championships. Paradeiser lost to fellow Australian counterpart Robyn Lambourne in the women's singles final (10–8, 9–2, 9–3), her career best performance in international level and also became the first Australian to lose the women's junior world title final as it was an all-Australian clash.

She also competed at the 1983 Women's World Open Squash Championship where she was knocked out of the second round.

References

External links 

 

Date of birth missing (living people)
Living people
Australian female squash players
Year of birth missing (living people)